The Chennai Silks is chain of retail textile shops in South India.

History
Its founder Thiru. A. Kulandaivel Mudaliar, who was lived in a village near Avinashi, entered the business in 1962. However its first textile shop was started in Tirupur in 1991 as  'Kumaran silks' with his hard work, later renamed as 'The Chennai Silks' in 2001. They also export clothes for chain stores in the United States and Europe including Decathlon, Carrefour, TESCO and Hanes.

Locations
The largest textile kingdom in Tamil Nadu, The Chennai Silks has proven to be a shopper's delight for pure Kanchipuram silk sarees. It has a widespread reach with sprawling showrooms across India.

Records
In 2007, a Guinness world record - "most expensive silk saree" was created by Chennai Silks. It was worth about $100,021; £50,679 (WORTH ₹41 LAKHS) and features reproductions of 11 famous paintings by the Indian artist Raja Ravi Varma. The main image is a reproduction of Varma's famous 'Galaxy of Musicians'. It took around 4760 man-hours to complete the design.

References

External links
 

Retailing
Companies based in Tiruppur
1962 establishments in Madras State
Indian companies established in 1962
World record holders